The second siege of Jinju was a battle during 1593 in Hideyoshi's invasions of Korea at Jinju Fort. It occurred from 20 July to 27 July and ended in the massacre of the entire garrison and a substantial portion of the population. The Second Battle of Jinju became the origin of the Uwajima Ushi-oni Festival in Uwajima, Ehime Prefecture, Japan.

Background 
Toyotomi Hideyoshi was determined to take Jinju and ordered the previous Japanese failure to take the city. Konishi Yukinaga informed Ming military advisor Shen Weijing of Kato's intent to attack and told him that it was merely a face-saving gesture rather than a new offensive. Shen advised the Korean military to avoid Jinju and let the Japanese destroy it. Kim Chŏn-il did not heed Shen's advice and brought his militia along with Korean military personnel led by Hwang Jin, a righteous army led by Ko Chong-hu, and others into Jinju, intending to defend it from Kato. Not knowing where the Japanese were going, the Koreans divided their forces with Kim Cheon-il, commanding the garrison of 4,000 soldiers at Jinju. 

The Japanese arrived at Jinju on 20 July 1593 with 90,000 troops with reinforcements from Japan. Ukita Hideie led 90,000 Japanese troops to take Jinju, making it the largest mobilization of Japanese forces for a single operation in the entire war. The Japanese began to construct wooden shields to allow them to advance against the walls. To the west were Konishi Yukinaga with 26,000 men, and to the north were Kato Kiyomasa with 25,000 while Ukita Hideie and Kikkawa Hiroie commanded the reserve of 17,000.

Battle
On 21 July 1593, the Japanese attacked, breaking the dyke that filled the moat around Jinju. At the same time, the samurai advanced under their wooden shields to be stopped by Korean fire arrows, cannonballs, and arquebuses. The Japanese then raised scaling ladders under the cover of arquebusiers, and the Koreans dumped rocks and hot burning oil on the Japanese. On 22 July, the Japanese tried again with siege towers, but Korean cannon fire destroyed them. On 23 July, the Japanese attacked again with siege towers, which were knocked down by Korean cannon fire. 

On 24 July, the Japanese now attacked with armored carts called "tortoiseshell wagons," which allowed the Japanese to advance up to the walls, where the sappers would pull out the stones of a section of the outer wall, but as a Japanese account complained: "They tried to attack, but from inside the castle soldiers threw pine torches to set the grass alight. The soldiers inside the tortoise wagons also burned and retreated". On 25 July, under a flag of truce, Ukita sent a messenger to Kim, telling him that the Japanese would slaughter 10,000 Korean peasants whom they had taken prisoner if Jinju did not surrender at once. Kim refused to surrender, replying that Chinese reinforcements were coming to rescue them. That was not true; Shen Weijing and his fellow Chinese generals had decided not to defend Jinju. 10,000 Korean peasants were beheaded.

On 27 July, the Japanese attacked the same weakened wall area with the "tortoise shell wagons." Still, a heavy thunderstorm prevented Korean attempts to incinerate the Japanese by dropping torches soaked in fat. With the aid of a rainstorm, the Japanese sappers broke down a section of the wall dislodging its foundations, and a great rush broke out with the samurai pushing each other down as it was a great honor to be the first samurai to enter a fortress. Goto Mototsugu, a retainer of Kuroda Nagamasa, was about to be the first samurai to enter Jinju when Iida Kakbei, a retainer of Kato Kiyomasa, threw the Nichiren flag into the breach to claim that honor for himself. The Korean garrison was out of ammunition and was short of swords, so many Koreans fought with wooden sticks against the surge of samurai armed with katanas. Hwang Jin survived two shots in the chest but kept fighting until he succumbed to his wounds, crumbling the defenders' morale.

General Sŏ Yewon engaged in long single combat with a samurai named Okamoto Gonjo, which ended when the wounded General Sŏ lost his breath and fell by a tree. Okamoto took the chance to sever his head with a single blow from his katana. Sŏ's head fell by the Nam River, which as it was a great honor for a samurai to take the head of their enemies. Okamoto ordered a search to find Sŏ's head so that it could be salted and taken back to Japan. The Korean commander, General Kim Cheon-il, committed suicide. The Japanese took no prisoners, killing almost everyone, both military and civilian. The Nam River ran red with blood as thousands attempted to swim across it, only to be cut down by the samurai waiting on the other side.

Aftermath
The Japanese generals spared the kisaeng (courtesans) of Jinju to press them into service. The Japanese celebrated their victory the same evening at the Ch'oksŏngu Pavilion on a nearby hill, offering the best view of the "hellish scene" below them. One courtesan, Nongae, attracted the attention of a samurai, Keyamura Rokunosuke, whom she lured to a cliff by promising him sex, and then threw both herself and him off the cliff, becoming a national heroine in Korea. Jinju was taken only for symbolic purposes, and instead of advancing, the Japanese force at Jinju retreated to Busan as there was a larger Chinese force to the north. Toyotomi Hideyoshi was well satisfied that he had avenged the defeat of 1592 at Jinju, though Turnbull argued that to lose so many men to take a town only for symbolic reasons was wasteful.

The chronicler of the Kato clan noted: "All the Chinese were terrified of our Japanese blades and jumped into the river, but we pulled them and cut off their heads." Korean accounts mention that the death toll at Jinju was 60,000. Afterwards the Japanese retreated to Busan. According to Japanese accounts, mentions they had sent 20,000 heads back to Japan after their victory.

Citations

Bibliography

 
 ; originally appeared as "Nihongata kai chitsujo no keisei" in Nihon no shakaishi 1, Rettō naigai no kōtsu to kokka. Tokyo: Iwanami shoten, 1987.
 
 
 
 
 
 
 
 
 桑田忠親 [Kuwata, Tadachika], ed., 舊參謀本部編纂, [Kyu Sanbo Honbu], 朝鮮の役 [Chousen no Eki]　(日本の戰史 [Nihon no Senshi] Vol. 5), 1965.
 
 
 
 
 
 
 
 
 
 
 
 
  
 
 
 
 
  (A lecture delivered to the Hong Kong Branch of the Royal Asiatic Society at the Hong Kong Club, 10 June 1980)
 

1593 in Asia
Jinju 1593
Jinju